Nawdm is a Gur language of Togo and Ghana. There are about 8000 of the speakers in Ghana and 200 000 speakers in Togo.

Nawdm in Ghana 

Nawdm is spoken in the Greater Accra  ( capital city of Ghana) and in the Volta  Region(now Region of Volta and Oti). It is known by several names including "loso" (or "losu"), and "nawdm" (sometimes spelled "naoudem" or "nawdam"). The first of these terms is improper and ambiguous. It is given by other language groups to refer to the Lamba (those who do not speak Nawdm) and the Nawdba (those who speak Nawdm).

Nawdm In Togo 

It is spoken in the Prefecture of Doufelgou. Doufelgou is located in the Kara Region.

It is spoken precisely in five places called cantons. Namely: Niamtougou, Koka, Baga, Ténéga and Siou. Nawdm is also spoken in the villages of Bogawaré and Kawa-Bas in the canton of Pouda, and in the village of Koré-Nata in the canton of Massédéna, still in the prefecture of Doufelgou. Historically, the latter are the descendants of the village of Banaa, formerly located roughly equidistant from Koka, Ténéga and Siou-Kpadb, on the outskirts of what is now called SORAD, from where they were driven out by the people of Baga shortly before the arrival of the Germans. The immediate neighbors of the Nawdba in this prefecture are: in the North, the Lamba of Défalé; in the South, the Kabyè of Pya; to the east, the Kabyè of Massédéna and Péssaré; to the west, the Lamba of Agbandé and of Yaka.

According to the most recent classifications of Bendor-Samuel in 1989 and those of Heine and Nurse in 2004, the nawdm belongs to the yom – nawdm group of the Oti-Volta subfamily of the central Gur or Voltaic languages, the gur family being a branch Niger-Congo languages. These classifications are based on the work of historical and comparative linguistics of Gabriel Manessy who demonstrated that nawdm was not, as some had initially believed, a dialect of Mooré, but a language which, while certainly being related to Mooré, however, belongs to another linguistic sub-group.

Nawdm is only spoken among its speakers. A few rare non-native speakers are also interested in this language. It is a very beautiful language especially when listening to the sounds while singing.

The term Losso is a vague local designation, never employed by linguists, referring to both the Nawdm and Lamba people.

Orthography 

To distinguish a sequence of two consonants and a consonant represented by two letters, the diaeresis is used on the first letters of the sequence of two consonants, for example: the sequence of consonants (g̈w, g̈b, n̈y, ŋ̈m).

The uppercase letter Ĥ corresponds to the lowercase letter ɦ (the usual correspondence would be Ĥ/ĥ and Ɦ/ɦ).

The high tone is denoted by the acute accent and the low tone is denoted by the grave accent, although in usual writing, the tone is only written in pronouns.

External links

References

Oti–Volta languages
Languages of Togo